The women's tournament of basketball at the 1992 Olympics at Barcelona, Spain began on July 30 and ended on August 7, when the Unified Team defeated China 76–66 for the gold medal.

Participants

Format
 Two groups of four teams are formed, where the top two from each group advance to the knockout stage.
 Third and fourth places from each group form an additional bracket to decide 5th–8th places in the final ranking.
 The winning teams from the semifinals contest the gold medal. The losing teams contest the bronze.

Ties were broken via the following the criteria, with the first option used first, all the way down to the last option:
 Head to head results

Schedule

Squads

Preliminary round
The best two teams from each group advanced to the semifinals. The United States and Cuba advanced undefeated through the group phase but couldn't reach the finals and ended up facing each other for the bronze medal instead.

Group A

Group B

Knockout stage

Classification round 5th−8th place
Semifinals

7th-place game

5th-place game

Semifinals

Bronze-medal game

Gold-medal game

Awards

Final standings

References

 Official Olympic Report

 
Basketball at the 1992 Summer Olympics
Basketball at the Summer Olympics – Women's tournament